Vrhaveč is a municipality and village in Klatovy District in the Plzeň Region of the Czech Republic. It has about 900 inhabitants.

Administrative parts
Villages of Malá Víska, Neznašovy and Radinovy are administrative parts of Vrhaveč.

References

Villages in Klatovy District